Ministry of Electricity and Energy may refer to:

 Ministry of Electricity and Energy (Egypt)
 Ministry of Electricity and Energy (Myanmar)